2012 FIBA World Olympic Qualifying Tournament may refer to:

 2012 FIBA World Olympic Qualifying Tournament for Men
 2012 FIBA World Olympic Qualifying Tournament for Women